St. George's Church, Cheppad (founded 1924), is a church in a village known as Cheppad or Cheppaud in Alappuzha district of Kerala state of India. St. George's Church in Cheppad belongs to the Niranam Diocese of the Malankara Archdiocese, under the supreme ecclesiastical jurisdiction of the Syriac Orthodox Church, headed by Syriac Orthodox Patriarch of Antioch and all the East.

External links
 Niranam diocese
 St. George Jacobite Syrian Orthodox Church
 Orthodox website from India
 Syriac Orthodox Resources
 SOCMNet - Internet platform of Malankara Jacobite Syrian Christians

Churches in Alappuzha district
Syriac Orthodox churches in India
Churches in Cheppad
Churches completed in 1924
20th-century churches in India
20th-century Oriental Orthodox church buildings